Stănel Stoica (born 24 January 1980) is a Romanian weightlifter. He competed in the men's lightweight event at the 2004 Summer Olympics.

References

1980 births
Living people
Romanian male weightlifters
Olympic weightlifters of Romania
Weightlifters at the 2004 Summer Olympics
Sportspeople from Constanța
21st-century Romanian people